Several sporting events have been titled as the Malaysian Masters or similar:

Malaysia Masters, a badminton tournament held since 2009.
Malaysian Dunlop Masters, a golf tournament held from 1974 to 1984.
Malaysian Masters, a golf tournament held from 1988 to 1992, and an Australasian Tour event from 1991.
Pulai Springs Malaysian Masters, an Asian Tour golf tournament held in 2006.
Volvo Masters of Asia, an Asian Tour golf tournament held from 2002 to 2008, hosted in Malaysia in 2002 and 2004.
Volvo Masters of Malaysia, a golf tournament held from 1994 to 2001, and an Asian Tour event from 1997.